Orient is an unincorporated community in northeastern Tom Green County, Texas. The community's name originated from its location along the Kansas City, Mexico and Orient Railway.

References

External links

 

Unincorporated communities in Tom Green County, Texas
Unincorporated communities in Texas